Jeovânio Rocha do Nascimento or simply Jeovânio (born November 11, 1977, in Goiânia, Brazil) is a Brazilian defensive midfielder.

Career
Jeovânio made three appearances in the 2002 Campeonato Brasileiro Série A with Sociedade Esportiva Palmeiras.

On February 10, 2007 he made his Ligue 1 debut with Valenciennes against Nantes

Judicial problems
In March 2016 he was sentenced to ten months in jail by a French court for failing to pay  €142 000 in taxes while playing for Valenciennes FC

References
 L'Equipe. lequipe.fr. Retrieved March 28, 2016

External links

1977 births
Living people
Brazilian footballers
Brazilian expatriate footballers
Expatriate footballers in France
América Futebol Clube (SP) players
Atlético Clube Goianiense players
Figueirense FC players
Grêmio Foot-Ball Porto Alegrense players
Sociedade Esportiva Palmeiras players
Valenciennes FC players
Santa Cruz Futebol Clube players
Guaratinguetá Futebol players
Ligue 1 players
Sportspeople from Goiânia
Association football midfielders